John Arthur McNaught (1892–1972) was a Scottish footballer who played as an outside right. His longest spells were at Falkirk and Kilmarnock; he won the Scottish Cup with both clubs, being one of few players to win that trophy with two different clubs not including Rangers or Celtic.

Career
Born in Glasgow, McNaught began his career in the Junior grade. He represented Scotland at that level in 1911 while playing for Cambuslang Rangers, where he won the Glasgow Junior League and his teammates included future Liverpool goalkeeper Kenny Campbell.

In the summer of 1911 he signed for Falkirk as a replacement for Jock Simpson who had moved to Blackburn Rovers; at the time, the Brockville Park outfit were one of the top clubs in Scotland having finished runners-up in the Scottish Football League in 1909–10 and third in 1910–11. With the Bairns, McNaught lifted the Scottish Cup after a 2–0 win over Raith Rovers in the 1913 final at Celtic Park. It was the club's first major honour. Falkirk also won several minor regional trophies during the period but never finished higher than fifth until McNaught made his last appearance at the end of the 1915–16 season, with World War I well underway (the Cup was cancelled during the conflict, however the League continued). In 1919, while still registered with Falkirk, he spent short spells with Vale of Leven and St Mirren (playing no part in the Paisley club's run to the 1919 Victory Cup).

With the war at an end, McNaught signed for Kilmarnock, finding success in his first season with the Ayrshire side as they won the 1919–20 Scottish Cup, defeating Albion Rovers 3–2 at Hampden Park. Like Falkirk, it was Killie's maiden victory in the competition, at the 42nd attempt. However, their performances in the league were mediocre during his three campaigns at Rugby Park (8th, 11th and 17th).

Now in his 30s, in 1922 he moved to second tier Johnstone, spending two years there before one-year spells at the same level with Clyde and East Stirlingshire.

Other player
There was another Scottish player in the period named John McNaught who had the same position on the field, and had a spell at Queens Park Rangers between 1908 and 1911, playing in the 1908 FA Charity Shield replay; this is not the same man as described above.

References

1892 births
Date of birth unknown
1972 deaths
Date of death unknown
Scottish footballers
Footballers from Glasgow
Association football wingers
Cambuslang Rangers F.C. players
Falkirk F.C. players
Vale of Leven F.C. wartime guest players
St Mirren F.C. wartime guest players
Kilmarnock F.C. players
Johnstone F.C. players
Clyde F.C. players
East Stirlingshire F.C. players
Scottish Junior Football Association players
Scotland junior international footballers
Scottish Football League players